U.S. Route 89 (US 89) in the U.S. state of Arizona is a U.S. Highway that begins in Flagstaff and heads north to the Utah border northwest of Page.

Route description
US 89 begins at a junction with I-40 Bus. / US 180 in the city of Flagstaff, Arizona. The highway proceeds northeast, passing by suburban development and the San Francisco Peaks to the west. The highway then continues north through forested areas near Coconino National Forest and Sunset Crater Volcano National Monument.

US 89 progresses north through sparsely populated desert areas. The highway passes through the community of Gray Mountain before entering the Navajo Nation. In the town of Cameron, the highway passes local businesses before intersecting with AZ 64, the highway that leads to the east entrance of Grand Canyon National Park. After the traffic circle with AZ 64, the road crosses over the Little Colorado River next to the decommissioned Cameron Suspension Bridge, which carried US 89 until 1959.

The highway continues through unpopulated areas of the Navajo Nation, intersecting with the western terminus of US 160 near Tuba City. North of Tuba City, US 89 closely parallels the western edge of the Echo Cliffs. In Bitter Springs, the highway splits into US 89 and US Route 89A, with the latter road continuing to the west towards Kanab, Utah, where the two routes rejoin. Mainline US 89 proceeds northeast, ascending the Echo Cliffs towards Page, Arizona.

Near Page, the highway passes near Horseshoe Bend and Antelope Canyon before meeting the western terminus of AZ 98. It continues past hotels and local businesses before abruptly turning to the west, crossing over the Colorado River on the Glen Canyon Dam Bridge just south of the Glen Canyon Dam and Lake Powell. The road travels northwest, passing through Glen Canyon National Recreation Area before entering Utah.

History
Prior to 1992, the southern terminus of US 89 was at Nogales, Arizona.  US 89 ran concurrently with Interstate 19 (I-19) until Green Valley.  The route was taken (in a northerly direction) through Tucson via 6th Avenue, Congress Street and Granada Avenue.  The route was carried out of Tucson via State Route 77 (SR 77).  Further north it was carried via the Pinal Pioneer Parkway northwest out of Oracle Junction on SR 79. In Maricopa County, it ran concurrently with existing US 60 along Main Street in Mesa, Apache Boulevard and Mill Avenue in Tempe, then along Van Buren Street in Phoenix to Grand Avenue, then to Wickenburg. Departing Wickenburg, it followed US 93 and SR 89 to Prescott. Departing Prescott, the route followed present-day SR 89 to Ash Fork, then ran east concurrently with I-40 to Flagstaff.

In Flagstaff, US 89 ran along old Route 66, Milton Road and Santa Fe Avenue. The highway crossed the Little Colorado River at Cameron on the Cameron Suspension Bridge until 1959, when the bridge was retired and replaced by a parallel span.

Traffic was re-routed via  of secondary and tertiary roads on the Navajo Reservation. Alternate routes through Las Vegas, Nevada, or Hurricane, Utah, and Marble Canyon (US 89A) were also suggested. US 89T (see below) opened in August 2013 as a bypass of the closed section, utilizing Navajo Route 20 as an alignment.

U.S. 89 reopened in March 2015 after a $25 million repair project.

Major intersections

U.S. Route 89T

U.S. Route 89T (US 89T or US 89X) was the designation for Navajo Route 20 (N20), a road running mostly parallel to US 89 in Arizona. Added to the Arizona state highway system in 2013, US 89T served as a temporary detour for a closed section of US 89.

The loss of this stretch of road forced detours for traffic entering the Page area from the south. The Navajo Nation declared a state of emergency. Motorists were rerouted on a  detour via US 160 and SR 98 or a  detour on N20, which had a  unpaved stretch. As a result, commute times into Page increased, and merchants in Page and the surrounding area lost significant business.

The Arizona Department of Transportation (ADOT) added the road to the state highway system as US 89T and quickly moved to get money ($35 million from the Federal Highway Administration's emergency relief project fund) and equipment to pave the road. As the Navajo had wanted to pave N20 for decades, and some design and environmental clearances had already been obtained, it took just 79 days to pave N20 in a project that might have otherwise taken more than a year. In addition to pavement, right-of-way and fencing to separate the road from the local livestock population were required. The improved road opened to traffic on August 29, 2013. Plans called for the road to be used for three years before the road reverted to Bureau of Indian Affairs jurisdiction.

Initially, the route lacked proper fencing, cattle guards, and pavement markings to support safe travel at higher speeds.
As of October 15, US 89T restrictions were lifted following the installation of upgraded control features.

With the reopening of mainline US 89 in March 2015, the US 89T designation was retired and ownership of the route returned to the Navajo Nation in April 2015. The route from The Gap to SR 98 is currently designated only as N20.

Major intersections

See also
U.S. Route 89A
Arizona State Route 89
Arizona State Route 89A

References

Further reading

External links

US 89 Landslide at ADOT 

89
 Arizona
Transportation in Coconino County, Arizona